Trump Productions LLC was an American television production company established by Donald Trump in 2004 until its ceased operations in 2015 that serves as the entertainment business wing of the Trump Organization. The company produces network and cable television shows including The Apprentice and Celebrity Apprentice in association with Mark Burnett Productions. Until 2015, the firm also produced the Miss USA and Miss Universe pageants. Financial disclosures made during the Trump campaign valued the business at $15 million, with revenue over $4 million in 2015.

Donald Trump served as the Chairman and CEO of the company, which is currently based in Los Angeles, California.

Past and current productions 
 The Apprentice (U.S.) (2004)
 Pageant Place (2007)
 Celebrity Apprentice (2008)
 Donald J. Trump Presents The Ultimate Merger (2010)

See also
List of things named after Donald Trump

References

External links 
 Official Website

2004 establishments in California
Assets owned by the Trump Organization
Companies based in Los Angeles
Mass media companies established in 2004
Television production companies of the United States